Friedrich Engels (28 November 1820 – 5 August 1895) was a German philosopher, critic of political economy, historian, political theorist and revolutionary socialist. He was also a businessman, journalist and political activist, whose father was an owner of large textile factories in Salford (Lancashire, England) and Barmen, Prussia (now Wuppertal, Germany).

Engels developed what is now known as Marxism together with Karl Marx. In 1845, he published The Condition of the Working Class in England, based on personal observations and research in English cities. In 1848, Engels co-authored The Communist Manifesto with Marx and also authored and co-authored (primarily with Marx) many other works. Later, Engels supported Marx financially, allowing him to do research and write Das Kapital. After Marx's death, Engels edited the second and third volumes of Das Kapital. Additionally, Engels organised Marx's notes on the Theories of Surplus Value which were later published as the "fourth volume" of Das Kapital. In 1884, he published The Origin of the Family, Private Property and the State on the basis of Marx's ethnographic research.

On 5 August 1895, aged 74, Engels died of laryngeal cancer in London. Following cremation, his ashes were scattered off Beachy Head, near Eastbourne.

Biography

Early life 

Friedrich Engels was born on 28 November 1820 in Barmen, Jülich-Cleves-Berg, Prussia (now Wuppertal, Germany), as eldest son of Friedrich Engels Sr. (1796–1860) and of Elisabeth "Elise" Franziska Mauritia von Haar (1797–1873). The wealthy Engels family owned large cotton-textile mills in Barmen and Salford, both expanding industrial metropoles. Friedrich's parents were devout Pietist Protestants and they raised their children accordingly.

At the age of 13, Engels attended grammar school (Gymnasium) in the adjacent city of Elberfeld but had to leave at 17, due to pressure from his father, who wanted him to become a businessman and start work as a mercantile apprentice in the family firm. After a year in Barmen, the young Engels was, in 1838, sent by his father to undertake an apprenticeship at a trading house in Bremen. His parents expected that he would follow his father into a career in the family business. Their son's revolutionary activities disappointed them. It would be some years before he joined the family firm.

Whilst at Bremen, Engels began reading the philosophy of Georg Wilhelm Friedrich Hegel, whose teachings dominated German philosophy at that time. In September 1838 he published his first work, a poem entitled "The Bedouin", in the Bremisches Conversationsblatt No. 40. He also engaged in other literary work and began writing newspaper articles critiquing the societal ills of industrialisation. He wrote under the pseudonym "Friedrich Oswald" to avoid connecting his family with his provocative writings.

In 1841, Engels performed his military service in the Prussian Army as a member of the Household Artillery. Assigned to Berlin, he attended university lectures at the University of Berlin and began to associate with groups of Young Hegelians. He anonymously published articles in the Rheinische Zeitung, exposing the poor employment- and living-conditions endured by factory workers. The editor of the Rheinische Zeitung was Karl Marx, but Engels would not meet Marx until late November 1842. Engels acknowledged the influence of German philosophy on his intellectual development throughout his career. In 1840, he also wrote: "To get the most out of life you must be active, you must live and you must have the courage to taste the thrill of being young."

Engels developed atheistic beliefs and his relationship with his parents became strained.

Manchester and Salford 
In 1842, his parents sent the 22-year-old Engels to Manchester, England, a manufacturing centre where industrialisation was on the rise. He was to work in Weaste, Salford, in the offices of Ermen and Engels's Victoria Mill, which made sewing threads. Engels's father thought that working at the Manchester firm might make his son reconsider some of his radical opinions. On his way to Manchester, Engels visited the office of the Rheinische Zeitung in Cologne and met Karl Marx for the first time. Initially they were not impressed with each other. Marx mistakenly thought that Engels was still associated with the Berliner Young Hegelians, with whom Marx had just broken off ties.

In Manchester, Engels met Mary Burns, a fierce young Irish woman with radical opinions who worked in the Engels factory. They began a relationship that lasted 20 years until her death in 1863. The two never married, as both were against the institution of marriage. While Engels regarded stable monogamy as a virtue, he considered the current state and church-regulated marriage as a form of class oppression. Burns guided Engels through Manchester and Salford, showing him the worst districts for his research.

Engels was often described as a man with a very strong libido and not much restraint. He had numerous affairs with a string of lovers and despite his condemnation of prostitution as "exploitation of the proletariat by the bourgeoisie" he also occasionally paid for sex. In 1846 he wrote to Marx: "If I had an income of 5000 francs I would do nothing but work and amuse myself with women until I went to pieces. If there were no Frenchwomen, life wouldn't be worth living. But so long as there are grisettes, well and good!" His most controversial relationship was with the wife of his rival Moses Hess, Sibylle, who later accused him of rape.

While in Manchester between October and November 1843, Engels wrote his first critique of political economy, entitled "Outlines of a Critique of Political Economy". Engels sent the article to Paris, where Marx published it in the Deutsch–Französische Jahrbücher in 1844.

While observing the slums of Manchester in close detail, Engels took notes of its horrors, notably child labour, the despoiled environment, and overworked and impoverished labourers. He sent a trilogy of articles to Marx. These were published in the Rheinische Zeitung and then in the Deutsch–Französische Jahrbücher, chronicling the conditions among the working class in Manchester. He later collected these articles for his influential first book, The Condition of the Working Class in England (1845). Written between September 1844 and March 1845, the book was published in German in 1845. In the book, Engels described the "grim future of capitalism and the industrial age", noting the details of the squalor in which the working people lived. The book was published in English in 1887. Archival resources contemporary to Engels's stay in Manchester shed light on some of the conditions he describes, including a manuscript (MMM/10/1) held by special collections at the University of Manchester. This recounts cases seen in the Manchester Royal Infirmary, where industrial accidents dominated and which resonate with Engels's comments on the disfigured persons seen walking round Manchester as a result of such accidents.

Engels continued his involvement with radical journalism and politics. He frequented areas popular among members of the English labour and Chartist movements, whom he met. He also wrote for several journals, including The Northern Star, Robert Owen's New Moral World, and the Democratic Review newspaper.

Paris 

Engels decided to return to Germany in 1844. On the way, he stopped in Paris to meet Karl Marx, with whom he had an earlier correspondence. Marx had been living in Paris since late October 1843, after the Rheinische Zeitung was banned in March 1843 by Prussian governmental authorities. Prior to meeting Marx, Engels had become established as a fully developed materialist and scientific socialist, independent of Marx's philosophical development.

In Paris, Marx was publishing the Deutsch–Französische Jahrbücher. Engels met Marx for a second time at the Café de la Régence on the Place du Palais, 28 August 1844. The two quickly became close friends and remained so their entire lives. Marx had read and was impressed by Engels's articles on The Condition of the Working Class in England in which he had written that "[a] class which bears all the disadvantages of the social order without enjoying its advantages, [...] Who can demand that such a class respect this social order?" Marx adopted Engels's idea that the working class would lead the revolution against the bourgeoisie as society advanced toward socialism, and incorporated this as part of his own philosophy.

Engels stayed in Paris to help Marx write The Holy Family. It was an attack on the Young Hegelians and the Bauer brothers, and was published in late February 1845. Engels's earliest contribution to Marx's work was writing for the Deutsch–Französische Jahrbücher, edited by both Marx and Arnold Ruge, in Paris in 1844. During this time in Paris, both Marx and Engels began their association with and then joined the secret revolutionary society called the League of the Just. The League of the Just had been formed in 1837 in France to promote an egalitarian society through the overthrow of the existing governments. In 1839, the League of the Just participated in the 1839 rebellion fomented by the French utopian revolutionary socialist, Louis Auguste Blanqui; however, as Ruge remained a Young Hegelian in his belief, Marx and Ruge soon split and Ruge left the Deutsch–Französische Jahrbücher. Nonetheless, following the split, Marx remained friendly enough with Ruge that he sent Ruge a warning on 15 January 1845 that the Paris police were going to execute orders against him, Marx and others at the Deutsch–Französische Jahrbücher requiring all to leave Paris within 24 hours. Marx himself was expelled from Paris by French authorities on 3 February 1845 and settled in Brussels with his wife and one daughter. Having left Paris on 6 September 1844, Engels returned to his home in Barmen, Germany, to work on his The Condition of the Working Class in England, which was published in late May 1845. Even before the publication of his book, Engels moved to Brussels in late April 1845, to collaborate with Marx on another book, German Ideology. While living in Barmen, Engels began making contact with Socialists in the Rhineland to raise money for Marx's publication efforts in Brussels; however, these contacts became more important as both Marx and Engels began political organizing for the Social Democratic Workers' Party of Germany.

Brussels 

The nation of Belgium, founded in 1830, was endowed with one of the most liberal constitutions in Europe and functioned as refuge for progressives from other countries. From 1845 to 1848, Engels and Marx lived in Brussels, spending much of their time organising the city's German workers. Shortly after their arrival, they contacted and joined the underground German Communist League. The Communist League was the successor organisation to the old League of the Just which had been founded in 1837, but had recently disbanded. Influenced by Wilhelm Weitling, the Communist League was an international society of proletarian revolutionaries with branches in various European cities.

The Communist League also had contacts with the underground conspiratorial organisation of Louis Auguste Blanqui. Many of Marx's and Engels's current friends became members of the Communist League. Old friends like Georg Friedrich Herwegh, who had worked with Marx on the Rheinsche Zeitung, Heinrich Heine, the famous poet, a young physician by the name of Roland Daniels, Heinrich Bürgers and August Herman Ewerbeck all maintained their contacts with Marx and Engels in Brussels. Georg Weerth, who had become a friend of Engels in England in 1843, now settled in Brussels. Carl Wallau and Stephen Born (real name Simon Buttermilch) were both German immigrant typesetters who settled in Brussels to help Marx and Engels with their Communist League work. Marx and Engels made many new important contacts through the Communist League. One of the first was Wilhelm Wolff, who was soon to become one of Marx's and Engels's closest collaborators. Others were Joseph Weydemeyer and Ferdinand Freiligrath, a famous revolutionary poet. While most of the associates of Marx and Engels were German immigrants living in Brussels, some of their new associates were Belgians. Phillipe Gigot, a Belgian philosopher and Victor Tedesco, a lawyer from Liège, both joined the Communist League. Joachim Lelewel a prominent Polish historian and participant in the Polish uprising of 1830–1831 was also a frequent associate.

The Communist League commissioned Marx and Engels to write a pamphlet explaining the principles of communism. This became the Manifesto of the Communist Party, better known as The Communist Manifesto. It was first published on 21 February 1848 and ends with the world-famous phrase: "Let the ruling classes tremble at a Communistic revolution. The proletariat have nothing to lose but their chains. They have a world to win. Working Men of All Countries, Unite!"

Engels's mother wrote in a letter to him of her concerns, commenting that he had "really gone too far" and "begged" him "to proceed no further". She further stated:You have paid more heed to other people, to strangers, and have taken no account of your mother's pleas. God alone knows what I have felt and suffered of late. I was trembling when I picked up the newspaper and saw therein that a warrant was out for my son's arrest.

Return to Prussia 
There was a revolution in France in 1848 that soon spread to other Western European countries. These events caused Engels and Marx to return to their homeland of the Kingdom of Prussia, specifically to the city of Cologne. While living in Cologne, they created and served as editors for a new daily newspaper called the Neue Rheinische Zeitung. Besides Marx and Engels, other frequent contributors to the Neue Rheinische Zeitung included Karl Schapper, Wilhelm Wolff, Ernst Dronke, Peter Nothjung, Heinrich Bürgers, Ferdinand Wolff and Carl Cramer. Friedrich Engels's mother, herself, gives unwitting witness to the effect of the Neue Rheinische Zeitung on the revolutionary uprising in Cologne in 1848. Criticising his involvement in the uprising she states in a 5 December 1848 letter to Friedrich that "nobody, ourselves included, doubted that the meetings at which you and your friends spoke, and also the language of (Neue) Rh.Z. were largely the cause of these disturbances."

Engels's parents hoped that young Engels would "decide to turn to activities other than those which you have been pursuing in recent years and which have caused so much distress". At this point, his parents felt the only hope for their son was to emigrate to America and start his life over. They told him that he should do this or he would "cease to receive money from us"; however, the problem in the relationship between Engels and his parents was worked out without Engels having to leave England or being cut off from financial assistance from his parents. In July 1851, Engels's father arrived to visit him in Manchester, England. During the visit, his father arranged for Engels to meet Peter Ermen of the office of Ermen & Engels, to move to Liverpool and to take over sole management of the office in Manchester.

In 1849, Engels travelled to the Kingdom of Bavaria for the Baden and Palatinate revolutionary uprising, an even more dangerous involvement. Starting with an article called "The Magyar Struggle", written on 8 January 1849, Engels, himself, began a series of reports on the Revolution and War for Independence of the newly founded Hungarian Republic. Engels's articles on the Hungarian Republic became a regular feature in the Neue Rheinische Zeitung under the heading "From the Theatre of War"; however, the newspaper was suppressed during the June 1849 Prussian coup d'état. After the coup, Marx lost his Prussian citizenship, was deported and fled to Paris and then London. Engels stayed in Prussia and took part in an armed uprising in South Germany as an aide-de-camp in the volunteer corps of August Willich. Engels also brought two cases of rifle cartridges with him when he went to join the uprising in Elberfeld on 10 May 1849. Later when Prussian troops came to Kaiserslautern to suppress an uprising there, Engels joined a group of volunteers under the command of August Willich, who were going to fight the Prussian troops. When the uprising was crushed, Engels was one of the last members of Willich's volunteers to escape by crossing the Swiss border. Marx and others became concerned for Engels's life until they finally heard from him.

Engels travelled through Switzerland as a refugee and eventually made it to safety in England. On 6 June 1849 Prussian authorities issued an arrest warrant for Engels which contained a physical description as "height: 5 feet 6 inches; hair: blond; forehead: smooth; eyebrows: blond; eyes: blue; nose and mouth: well proportioned; beard: reddish; chin: oval; face: oval; complexion: healthy; figure: slender. Special characteristics: speaks very rapidly and is short-sighted". As to his "short-sightedness", Engels admitted as much in a letter written to Joseph Weydemeyer on 19 June 1851 in which he says he was not worried about being selected for the Prussian military because of "my eye trouble, as I have now found out once and for all which renders me completely unfit for active service of any sort". Once he was safe in Switzerland, Engels began to write down all his memories of the recent military campaign against the Prussians. This writing eventually became the article published under the name "The Campaign for the German Imperial Constitution".

Back in Britain 

To help Marx with Neue Rheinische Zeitung Politisch-ökonomische Revue, the new publishing effort in London, Engels sought ways to escape the continent and travel to London. On 5 October 1849, Engels arrived in the Italian port city of Genoa. There, Engels booked passage on the English schooner, Cornish Diamond under the command of a Captain Stevens. The voyage across the western Mediterranean, around the Iberian Peninsula by sailing schooner took about five weeks. Finally, the Cornish Diamond sailed up the River Thames to London on 10 November 1849 with Engels on board.

Upon his return to Britain, Engels re-entered the Manchester company in which his father held shares to support Marx financially as he worked on Das Kapital. Unlike his first period in England (1843), Engels was now under police surveillance. He had "official" homes and "unofficial homes" all over Salford, Weaste and other inner-city Manchester districts where he lived with Mary Burns under false names to confuse the police. Little more is known, as Engels destroyed over 1,500 letters between himself and Marx after the latter's death so as to conceal the details of their secretive lifestyle.

Despite his work at the mill, Engels found time to write a book on Martin Luther, the Protestant Reformation and the 1525 revolutionary war of the peasants, entitled The Peasant War in Germany. He also wrote a number of newspaper articles including "The Campaign for the German Imperial Constitution" which he finished in February 1850 and "On the Slogan of the Abolition of the State and the German 'Friends of Anarchy'" written in October 1850. In April 1851, he wrote the pamphlet "Conditions and Prospects of a War of the Holy Alliance against France".

Marx and Engels denounced Louis Bonaparte when he carried out a coup against the French government and made himself president for life on 2 December 1851. In condemning this action, Engels wrote to Marx on 3 December 1851, characterising the coup as "comical" and referred to it as occurring on "the 18th Brumaire", the date of Napoleon I's coup of 1799 according to the French Republican Calendar. Marx was later to incorporate this comically ironic characterisation of Louis Bonaparte's coup into his essay about the coup. Indeed, Marx even called the essay The Eighteenth Brumaire of Louis Bonaparte again using Engels's suggested characterisation. Marx also borrowed Engels' characterisation of Hegel's notion of the World Spirit that history occurred twice, "once as a tragedy and secondly as a farce" in the first paragraph of his new essay.

Meanwhile, Engels started working at the mill owned by his father in Manchester as an office clerk, the same position he held in his teens while in Germany where his father's company was based. Engels worked his way up to become a partner of the firm in 1864. Five years later, Engels retired from the business and could focus more on his studies. At this time, Marx was living in London but they were able to exchange ideas through daily correspondence. One of the ideas that Engels and Marx contemplated was the possibility and character of a potential revolution in the Russias. As early as April 1853, Engels and Marx anticipated an "aristocratic-bourgeois revolution in Russia which would begin in "St. Petersburg with a resulting civil war in the interior". The model for this type of aristocratic-bourgeois revolution in Russia against the autocratic Tsarist government in favour of a constitutional government had been provided by the Decembrist Revolt of 1825.

Although an unsuccessful revolt against the Tsarist government in favour of a constitutional government, both Engels and Marx anticipated a bourgeois revolution in Russia would occur which would bring about a bourgeois stage in Russian development to precede a communist stage. By 1881, both Marx and Engels began to contemplate a course of development in Russia that would lead directly to the communist stage without the intervening bourgeois stage. This analysis was based on what Marx and Engels saw as the exceptional characteristics of the Russian village commune or obshchina. While doubt was cast on this theory by Georgi Plekhanov, Plekhanov's reasoning was based on the first edition of Das Kapital (1867) which predated Marx's interest in Russian peasant communes by two years. Later editions of the text demonstrate Marx's sympathy for the argument of Nikolay Chernyshevsky, that it should be possible to establish socialism in Russia without an intermediary bourgeois stage provided that the peasant commune were used as the basis for the transition.

In 1870, Engels moved to London where he and Marx lived until Marx's death in 1883. Engels's London home from 1870 to 1894 was at 122 Regent's Park Road. In October 1894 he moved to 41 Regent's Park Road, Primrose Hill, NW1, where he died the following year.

Marx's first London residence was a cramped apartment at 28 Dean Street, Soho. From 1856, he lived at 9 Grafton Terrace, Kentish Town, and then in a tenement at 41 Maitland Park Road in Belsize Park from 1875 until his death in March 1883.

Mary Burns suddenly died of heart disease in 1863, after which Engels became close with her younger sister Lydia ("Lizzie"). They lived openly as a couple in London and married on 11 September 1878, hours before Lizzie's death.

Later years 
Later in their life, both Marx and Engels came to argue that in some countries workers might be able to achieve their aims through peaceful means. In following this, Engels argued that socialists were evolutionists, although they remained committed to social revolution. Similarly, Tristram Hunt argues that Engels was sceptical of "top-down revolutions" and later in life advocated "a peaceful, democratic road to socialism". Engels also wrote in his introduction to the 1891 edition of Marx's The Class Struggles in France that "rebellion in the old style, street fighting with barricades, which decided the issue everywhere up to 1848, was to a considerable extent obsolete", although some such as David W. Lowell empashised their cautionary and tactical meaning, arguing that "Engels questions only rebellion 'in the old style', that is, insurrection: he does not renounce revolution. The reason for Engels' caution is clear: he candidly admits that ultimate victory for any insurrection is rare, simply on military and tactical grounds".

In his introduction to the 1895 edition of Marx's The Class Struggles in France, Engels attempted to resolve the division between reformists and revolutionaries in the Marxist movement by declaring that he was in favour of short-term tactics of electoral politics that included gradualist and evolutionary socialist measures while maintaining his belief that revolutionary seizure of power by the proletariat should remain a goal. In spite of this attempt by Engels to merge gradualism and revolution, his effort only diluted the distinction of gradualism and revolution and had the effect of strengthening the position of the revisionists. Engels's statements in the French newspaper Le Figaro, in which he wrote that "revolution" and the "so-called socialist society" were not fixed concepts, but rather constantly changing social phenomena, and argued that this made "us socialists all evolutionists", increased the public perception that Engels was gravitating towards evolutionary socialism. Engels also argued that it would be "suicidal" to talk about a revolutionary seizure of power at a time when the historical circumstances favoured a parliamentary road to power that he predicted could bring "social democracy into power as early as 1898". Engels's stance of openly accepting gradualist, evolutionary and parliamentary tactics while claiming that the historical circumstances did not favour revolution caused confusion. Marxist revisionist Eduard Bernstein interpreted this as indicating that Engels was moving towards accepting parliamentary reformist and gradualist stances, but he ignored that Engels's stances were tactical as a response to the particular circumstances and that Engels was still committed to revolutionary socialism. Engels was deeply distressed when he discovered that his introduction to a new edition of The Class Struggles in France had been edited by Bernstein and orthodox Marxist Karl Kautsky in a manner which left the impression that he had become a proponent of a peaceful road to socialism. On 1 April 1895, four months before his death, Engels responded to Kautsky:
I was amazed to see today in the Vorwärts an excerpt from my 'Introduction' that had been printed without my knowledge and tricked out in such a way as to present me as a peace-loving proponent of legality [at all costs]. Which is all the more reason why I should like it to appear in its entirety in the Neue Zeit in order that this disgraceful impression may be erased. I shall leave Liebknecht in no doubt as to what I think about it and the same applies to those who, irrespective of who they may be, gave him this opportunity of perverting my views and, what's more, without so much as a word to me about it.

After Marx's death, Engels devoted much of his remaining years to editing Marx's unfinished volumes of Das Kapital; however, he also contributed significantly in other areas. Engels made an argument using anthropological evidence of the time to show that family structures changed over history, and that the concept of monogamous marriage came from the necessity within class society for men to control women to ensure their own children would inherit their property. He argued a future communist society would allow people to make decisions about their relationships free of economic constraints. One of the best examples of Engels's thoughts on these issues are in his work The Origin of the Family, Private Property and the State. On 5 August 1895, Engels died of throat cancer in London, aged 74. Following cremation at Woking Crematorium, his ashes were scattered off Beachy Head, near Eastbourne, as he had requested.

Personality 

Engels's interests included poetry, fox hunting and hosting regular Sunday parties for London's left-wing intelligentsia where, as one regular put it, "no one left before two or three in the morning". His stated personal motto was "take it easy" while "jollity" was listed as his favourite virtue.

Of Engels's personality and appearance, Robert Heilbroner described him in The Worldly Philosophers as "tall and rather elegant, he had the figure of a man who liked to fence and to ride to hounds and who had once swum the Weser River four times without a break" as well as having been "gifted with a quick wit and facile mind" and of a gay temperament, being able to "stutter in twenty languages". He had a great enjoyment of wine and other "bourgeois pleasures". Engels favoured forming romantic relationships with women of the proletariat and found a long-term partner in a working-class woman named Mary Burns, although they never married. After her death, Engels was romantically involved with her younger sister Lydia Burns.

Historian and former Labour MP Tristram Hunt, author of The Frock-Coated Communist: The Revolutionary Life of Friedrich Engels, argues that Engels "almost certainly was, in other words, the kind of man Stalin would have had shot". Hunt sums up the disconnect between Engels's personality and the Soviet Union which later utilised his works, stating:

As to the religious persuasion attributable to Engels, Hunt writes:

Engels was a polyglot and was able to write and speak in numerous languages, including Russian, Italian, Portuguese, Irish, Spanish, Polish, French, English, German and the Milanese dialect.

Legacy 

In his biography of Engels, Vladimir Lenin wrote: "After his friend Karl Marx (who died in 1883), Engels was the finest scholar and teacher of the modern proletariat in the whole civilised world. [...] In their scientific works, Marx and Engels were the first to explain that socialism is not the invention of dreamers, but the final aim and necessary result of the development of the productive forces in modern society. All recorded history hitherto has been a history of class struggle, of the succession of the rule and victory of certain social classes over others." According to Paul Kellogg, there is "some considerable controversy" regarding "the place of Frederick Engels in the canon of 'classical Marxism'". While some such as Terrell Carver dispute "Engels' claim that Marx agreed with the views put forward in Engels' major theoretical work, Anti-Dühring", others such as E. P. Thompson "identified a tendency to make 'old Engels into a whipping boy, and to impugn him any sign that once chooses to impugn subsequent Marxsisms'".

Tristram Hunt argues that Engels has become a convenient scapegoat, too easily blamed for the state crimes of Communist regimes such as China, the Soviet Union and those in Africa and Southeast Asia, among others. Hunt writes that "Engels is left holding the bag of 20th century ideological extremism" while Karl Marx "is rebranded as the acceptable, post–political seer of global capitalism". Hunt largely exonerates Engels, stating that "[i]n no intelligible sense can Engels or Marx bear culpability for the crimes of historical actors carried out generations later, even if the policies were offered up in their honor". Andrew Lipow describes Marx and Engels as "the founders of modern revolutionary democratic socialism".

While admitting the distance between Marx and Engels on one hand and Joseph Stalin on the other, some writers such as Robert Service are less charitable, noting that the anarchist Mikhail Bakunin predicted the oppressive potential of their ideas, arguing that "[i]t is a fallacy that Marxism's flaws were exposed only after it was tried out in power. [...] [Marx and Engels] were centralisers. While talking about 'free associations of producers', they advocated discipline and hierarchy". Paul Thomas, of the University of California, Berkeley, claims that while Engels had been the most important and dedicated facilitator and diffuser of Marx's writings, he significantly altered Marx's intents as he held, edited and released them in a finished form and commentated on them. Engels attempted to fill gaps in Marx's system and extend it to other fields. In particular, Engels is said to have stressed historical materialism, assigning it a character of scientific discovery and a doctrine, forming Marxism as such. A case in point is Anti-Dühring which both supporters and detractors of socialism treated as an encompassing presentation of Marx's thought. While in his extensive correspondence with German socialists Engels modestly presented his own secondary place in the couple's intellectual relationship and always emphasised Marx's outstanding role, Russian communists such as Lenin raised Engels up with Marx and conflated their thoughts as if they were necessarily congruous. Soviet Marxists then developed this tendency to the state doctrine of dialectical materialism.

Since 1931, Engels has had a Russian city named after him—Engels, Saratov Oblast. It served as the capital of the Volga German Republic within Soviet Russia and as part of Saratov Oblast. In 2014, Engels's "magnificent beard" inspired a climbing wall sculpture in Salford. The  beard statue, described as a "symbol of wisdom and learning", was planned to stand on the campus of the University of Salford. Engine, the arts company behind the piece, stated that "the idea came from a 1980s plan to relocate an Eastern Bloc statue of the thinker to Manchester".

In the summer of 2017, as part of the Manchester International Festival, a Soviet-era statue of Engels was installed by sculptor Phil Collins at Tony Wilson Place in Manchester. It was transported from the village of Mala Pereshchepina in Eastern Ukraine, after the statue had been deposed from its central position in the village in the wake of laws outlawing communist symbols in Ukraine introduced in 2015. In recognition of the important influence Manchester had on his work, the 3.5 metre statue now stands in Tony Wilson Place, a prominent eatery district on Manchester's First Street. The installation of what was originally an instrument of propaganda drew criticism from Kevin Bolton in The Guardian.

The Friedrich Engels Guards Regiment (also known as NVA Guard Regiment 1) was a special guard unit of the East German National People's Army (NVA). The guard regiment was established in 1962 from parts of the Hugo Eberlein Guards Regiment but wasn't given the title "Friedrich Engels" until 1970.

Influences 
In spite of his criticism of the utopian socialists, Engels's own beliefs were nonetheless influenced by the French socialist Charles Fourier. From Fourier, he derives four main points that characterize the social conditions of a communist state. The first point maintains that every individual would be able to fully develop their talents by eliminating the specialization of production. Without specialization, every individual would be permitted to exercise any vocation of their choosing for as long or as little as they would like. If talents permitted it, one could be a baker for a year and an engineer the next. The second point builds upon the first as with the ability of workers to cycle through different jobs of their choosing, the fundamental basis of the social division of labour is destroyed and the social division of labour will disappear as a result. If anyone can employ himself at any job that he wishes, then there are clearly no longer any divisions or barriers to entry for labour, otherwise such fluidity between entirely different jobs would not exist. The third point continues from the second as once the social division of labour is gone, the division of social classes based on property ownership will fade with it. If labour division puts a man in charge of a farm, that farmer owns the productive resources of that farm. The same applies to the ownership of a factory or a bank. Without labour division, no single social class may claim exclusive rights to a particular means of production since the absence of labour division allows all to use it. Finally, the fourth point concludes that the elimination of social classes destroys the sole purpose of the state and it will cease to exist. As Engels stated in his own writing, the only purpose of the state is to abate the effects of class antagonisms. With the elimination of social classes based on property, the state becomes obsolete and a communist society, at least in the eyes of Engels, is achieved.

Major works

The Holy Family (1844) 

This book was written by Marx and Engels in November 1844. It is a critique on the Young Hegelians and their trend of thought which was very popular in academic circles at the time. The title was suggested by the publisher and is meant as a sarcastic reference to the Bauer Brothers and their supporters.

The book created a controversy with much of the press and caused Bruno Bauer to attempt to refute the book in an article published in  Vierteljahrsschrift in 1845. Bauer claimed that Marx and Engels misunderstood what he was trying to say. Marx later replied to his response with his own article published in the journal  in January 1846. Marx also discussed the argument in chapter 2 of The German Ideology.

The Condition of the Working Class in England (1845) 

A study of the deprived conditions of the working class in Manchester and Salford, based on Engels's personal observations. The work also contains seminal thoughts on the state of socialism and its development. Originally published in German and only translated into English in 1887, the work initially had little impact in England; however, it was very influential with historians of British industrialisation throughout the twentieth century.

The Peasant War in Germany (1850) 

An account of the early 16th-century uprising known as the German Peasants' War, with a comparison with the recent revolutionary uprisings of 1848–1849 across Europe.

Herr Eugen Dühring's Revolution in Science (1878) 

Popularly known as Anti-Dühring, this book is a detailed critique of the philosophical positions of Eugen Dühring, a German philosopher and critic of Marxism. In the course of replying to Dühring, Engels reviews recent advances in science and mathematics seeking to demonstrate the way in which the concepts of dialectics apply to natural phenomena. Many of these ideas were later developed in the unfinished work, Dialectics of Nature. Three chapters of Anti-Dühring were later edited and published under the separate title, Socialism: Utopian and Scientific.

Socialism: Utopian and Scientific (1880) 

One of the best selling socialist books of the era. In this work, Engels briefly described and analyzed the ideas of notable utopian socialists such as Charles Fourier and Robert Owen, pointed out their strongpoints and shortcomings, and provides an explanation of the scientific socialist framework for understanding of capitalism, and an outline of the progression of social and economic development from the perspective of historical materialism.

Dialectics of Nature (1883) 

Dialectics of Nature (German: "Dialektik der Natur") is an unfinished 1883 work by Engels that applies Marxist ideas, particularly those of dialectical materialism, to science. It was first published in the Soviet Union in 1925.

The Origin of the Family, Private Property and the State (1884) 

In this work, Engels argues that the family is an ever-changing institution that has been shaped by capitalism. It contains a historical view of the family in relation to issues of class, female subjugation and private property.

References

Sources 
 
 
 
 Fedoseyev, P.N.; Bakh, I.; Golman, L.I.; Kolpinksy, L.Y.; Krylov, B.A.; Kuzminov, I.I.; Malysh, A.I.; Mosolov, V.G. & Stepanova, Y. (1977). Karl Marx: A Biography, prepared by the Institute of Marxism–Leninism of the C.P.S.U. Central Committee, Moscow: Progress Publishers
 Green, John (2008). Engels: A Revolutionary Life, London: Artery Publications, 
 Henderson, W.O. (1976). The life of Friedrich Engels, London: Cass, 
 Hunt, Tristram (2009). The Frock-Coated Communist: The Revolutionary Life of Friedrich Engels, London: Allen Lane.

Further reading 
 Royle, Camilla (2020), A Rebel's Guide to Engels, London: Bookmarks.

External links 

 Marx/Engels Biographical Archive
 The Legend of Marx, or "Engels the founder" by Maximilien Rubel
 Reason in Revolt: Marxism and Modern Science
 Engels: The Che Guevara of his Day
 The Brave New World: Tristram Hunt On Marx and Engels' Revolutionary Vision
 German Biography from dhm.de
 
 
 
 
 Frederick Engels: A Biography (Soviet work)
 Frederick Engels: A Biography (East German work)
 Engels was Right: Early Human Kinship was Matriliineal
 Archive of Karl Marx / Friedrich Engels Papers at the International Institute of Social History
 
 
 
 
 Libcom.org/library Friedrich Engels archive
 Works by Friedrich Engels (in German) at Zeno.org
 Pathfinder Press 
 Friedrich Engels, "On Rifled Cannon", articles from the New York Tribune, April, May and June 1860, reprinted in Military Affairs 21, no. 4 (Winter 1957) ed. Morton Borden, 193–198.
 Marx and Engels in their native German language
Engels in Eastbourne - Commemorating the life, work and legacy of Friedrich Engels in Eastbourne

1820 births
1895 deaths
 
19th-century atheists
19th-century German economists
19th-century German male writers
19th-century German non-fiction writers
19th-century German philosophers
19th-century Prussian people
Atheist philosophers
European democratic socialists
German industrialists
German Communist writers
Deaths from throat cancer
German anti-capitalists
German atheism activists
German atheist writers
German emigrants to England
German journalists
German political philosophers
German revolutionaries
Karl Marx
Marxist theorists
German Marxist writers
Materialists
Members of the International Workingmen's Association
Orthodox Marxists
People from the Province of Jülich-Cleves-Berg
People from the Rhine Province
Businesspeople from Wuppertal
People of the Revolutions of 1848
Philosophers of culture
Philosophers of economics
Philosophers of history
Prussian Army personnel
German social commentators
Social philosophers
Socialist economists
Theoretical historians
Theorists on Western civilization
Urban theorists
19th-century German businesspeople
Writers from Wuppertal
Critics of political economy
Deaths from cancer in England